Terry Francis (born 28 July 1966) is a British tech house DJ and producer. Francis won Muzik Magazine's "Best New DJ" award in 1997. In October 1999, at the club's inception, he started a residency at London's Fabric, which has continued ever since.

He has worked as a producer under his own name and as Housey Doingz (with Nathan Coles). He has released several mix albums, including two volumes of Architecture and the second volume of the Fabric mix series, Fabric 02.

Discography
Gasworks (2015), Default Position
Architecture (1998), ARK 21
Architecture Vol 2 (1998), Pagan America
Freezeinwithm (2000), Ches-nut-cat
DJ Magazine Presents UCMG UK Selected Cuts (2001), DJ Magazine
Fabric 02 (2002), Fabric
Fabric 28 (2006), Fabric, as Wiggle with Nathan Coles

References

External links
 Terry Francis at Last.fm
 

1966 births
English DJs
Club DJs
Living people
Electronic dance music DJs